Bones is a nickname of the following:

People 

 Clarence Adams (boxer) (born 1974), American retired boxer and former World Boxing Association super bantamweight world champion
 Angus Allen (1881–1941), Canadian ice hockey player
 Elias Andra (born 1973), American rock drummer 
 Gary Berland (1950-1988), American poker player
 Gary Bromley (born 1950), Canadian retired National Hockey League and World Hockey Association goaltender
 Bobby Bryant (born 1944), American retired National Football League player
 Bones Ely (1863–1952), American Major League Baseball player
 Bones Hillman (born 1958), New Zealand musician
 Bones Howe (born 1933), American record producer and engineer
 Frank Jenner (1903-1977), English-Australian evangelist
 Jim "Bones" Mackay, caddy for golfer Phil Mickelson
 Tom Malone (musician) (born 1947), American jazz musician, arranger and producer
 Bones McKinney (1919–1997), American basketball player and coach
 Don Raleigh (1926-2012), Canadian National Hockey League player
 Sean Ryan (swimmer) (born 1992), American distance swimmer
 Dick Tomanek (born 1931), American retired Major League Baseball pitcher
 Bones Weatherly (1928–2004), American football player
 Jon Jones (born 1987), American mixed martial artist

Fictional characters 

 Temperance "Bones" Brennan, from the television series Bones
 Leonard McCoy, from the Star Trek franchise

See also 

 
 
 Jay Buhner (born 1964), American former Major League Baseball player nicknamed "Bone"
 Chandler Harper (1914-2004), American golfer nicknamed "Old Bones"
 Ivar the Boneless (died 873?), Viking leader
 Chris McDermott (born 1963), former Australian rules footballer nicknamed "Bone"
 T-Bone (disambiguation), which includes a list of people with the nickname

Lists of people by nickname